G.I. Blues is the third soundtrack album and seventh (overall) album by American singer and musician Elvis Presley, released by RCA Victor in mono and stereo, LPM/LSP 2256, in October 1960. It is the soundtrack to the 1960 film of the same name in which he starred. Recording sessions took place on April 27 and 28, and May 6, 1960, at RCA Victor Studio C and Radio Recorders in Hollywood, California. The album topped the Billboard Top Pop Album chart. It was certified gold on March 13, 1963 and platinum on March 27, 1992 by the Recording Industry Association of America. The album remained at the #1 spot for ten weeks.

Content
Music on this album comprised songs that had appeared in the film of the same name. The song "Wooden Heart" was released as a single in the United Kingdom, where it was number one for six weeks. It also was number one in Australia. In the United States, Joe Dowell recorded a cover version of "Wooden Heart" that topped the Billboard Hot 100. RCA Victor later released "Wooden Heart" by Presley as the b-side of a single twice, once in 1964 on the back of a reissue of "Blue Christmas," and again on the flip side of a belated issue in 1965 of "Puppet on a String" from the film Girl Happy. Four songs from this album appear on the 1995 soundtrack compilation Command Performances: The Essential 60s Masters II: "G.I. Blues", "Wooden Heart", "Shoppin' Around", and "Doin' the Best I Can".

Due to copyright reasons, the European version of the soundtrack album and film substitutes the opening track "Tonight Is So Right for Love" with the song "Tonight's All Right for Love", adapted from a melody by 19th century waltz-king Johann Strauss II, Tales from the Vienna Woods. The melody for "Tonight Is So Right for Love" was taken directly from a barcarolle composed by Jacques Offenbach, one of Strauss's contemporaries.  An American release of "Tonight's All Right for Love" did not occur until it appeared on the compilation album Elvis: A Legendary Performer Volume 1 in 1974. The version of "Blue Suede Shoes" used on the soundtrack is a new recording of the song Presley first recorded in 1956, and is one of only a few songs that Presley would re-record in a studio setting during his career, others being "Love Letters", "It Hurts Me" and "A Little Less Conversation".

The G.I. Blues soundtrack album was nominated for two Grammy Awards in 1960 in the categories Best Sound Track Album Or Recording Of Original Cast From A Motion Picture Or Television and Best Vocal Performance Album, Male.

Reissues
On April 27, 1997, RCA remastered the album for compact disc, adding eight outtakes from the recording session as bonus tracks. Two songs were previously released, the acoustic version of "Big Boots" appearing on the posthumous 1978 album Elvis Sings for Children and Grown-Ups Too, and the substitute "Tonight's All Right For Love". In 2012 G.I. Blues was released on the Follow That Dream label in a 7-inch digi-pack edition featuring a booklet and two CDs containing the original album tracks and numerous alternate takes. A follow-up album, Café Europa, which also contained a booklet and two CDs was released in 2013.  This album featured more alternate takes of the G.I. Blues soundtrack.

Personnel
Elvis Presley – vocals, acoustic rhythm guitar on "Shoppin' Around" (alt. version recorded April 27)
The Jordanaires – backing vocals
Scotty Moore – rhythm guitar, lead guitar on "Frankfort Special"
Tiny Timbrell – lead guitar, mandolin
Neal Matthews, Jr. – electric bass, guitar
Jimmie Haskell – accordion
Hoyt Hawkins – tambourine
Dudley Brooks – piano
Ray Siegel – double bass, tuba
D.J. Fontana – drums
 Frank Bode – drums on April 27 and April 28
 Bernie Mattinson – drums on May 6

Track listing

Original release

1997 CD reissue bonus tracks

2012 Follow That Dream release

2013 Café Europa Follow That Dream release

Chart positions

References

External links

LPM-2256 G.I. Blues Guide (monaural) part of The Elvis Presley Record Research Database
LSP-2256 G.I. Blues Guide (stereo) part of The Elvis Presley Record Research Database

1960 soundtrack albums
Elvis Presley soundtracks
RCA Victor soundtracks
Musical film soundtracks
Comedy film soundtracks